Sheila Mary Forbes  (born 31 December 1946), is a British educator, consultant and manager. She was principal of St Hilda's College, Oxford, from 2007 to 2014.

Forbes was born in Dorset, grew up in Wargrave near Henley, attended St Paul's Girls' School in London and received her B.A. in History from St Hilda's College, Oxford, in 1969. She has studied at the London School of Economics and at Bath University. She spent the first 25 years of her career managing organizational change as a human resources professional in the private sector, joining Philips Electronics in 1970 and becoming Personnel Director of Unigate plc in 1980. In 1988 she became an Executive Director at Storehouse and finished her corporate career at Reed Elsevier, where she was Human Resources Director from 1992 to 1996.  Since leaving Reed Elsevier she has been a consultant and non-executive director for several large companies.  From 1994 to 2000 she was a non-executive director for Lloyds TSB and is currently a non-executive director for OCS Group Ltd and Tribal Group plc.

She has also held a number of government, private, and public appointments, including Civil Service Commissioner, Chair of the Board of Governors of Thames Valley University, Chair of the Board of the Institute for Employment Studies and board member of the British Library and the Crafts Council.

In 2002 she was awarded the CBE for services to women in the workforce.

She has one brother, Duncan Forbes, an accountant in Hampshire and 5 years her junior. Her father, Alexander 'Sandy' Forbes, was a dentist in Slough.

References

External links

BBC article citing Forbes on changes at Thames Valley University

1946 births
Living people
People from Slough
Alumni of St Hilda's College, Oxford
English businesspeople
Commanders of the Order of the British Empire
People educated at St Paul's Girls' School
Alumni of the University of Bath
Alumni of the London School of Economics
Principals of St Hilda's College, Oxford